Tachycines is a genus of camel crickets in the subfamily Aemodogryllinae and tribe Aemodogryllini. Some authorities had placed the type species, T. asynamorus, in the genus Diestrammena, but recent papers returned this to the subgenus Tachycines (Tachycines), with a substantial number of new species recently described.

Species have a discontinuous distribution in Europe and eastern Asia (China, Korea, Japan), with species in subgenus Gymnaeta also found Indo-China and the Philippines. European records appear to refer to Tachycines asynamorus: the cosmopolitan 'greenhouse camel cricket', which has also spread to the USA.

Species
The Orthoptera Species File lists:
subgenus Gymnaeta Adelung, 1902
 Tachycines adelungi Chopard, 1921
 Tachycines altimontanus (Gorochov, 2010)
 Tachycines ater Li, Feng & Luo, 2021
 Tachycines belousovi (Gorochov, 2010)
 Tachycines beresowskii (Adelung, 1902)
 Tachycines bifolius Zhu, Chen & Shi, 2020
 Tachycines bifurcatus (Gorochov, 2010)
 Tachycines borutzkyi (Gorochov, 1994)
 Tachycines brevicaudus Karny, 1934
 Tachycines bruneri Karny, 1934
 Tachycines caudatus (Gorochov, Rampini & Di Russo, 2006)
 Tachycines cavernus (Jaio, Niu, Liu, Lei & Bi, 2008)
 Tachycines chenhui (Rampini & Di Russo, 2008)
 Tachycines coomani Chopard, 1929
 Tachycines cuenoti Chopard, 1929
 Tachycines dentatus Li, Feng & Luo, 2021
 Tachycines dianxicus Qin, Liu & Li, 2019
 Tachycines dispar Qin, Liu & Li, 2019
 Tachycines fallax (Zhang & Liu, 2009)
 Tachycines femoratus (Zhang & Liu, 2009)
 Tachycines ferecaecus (Gorochov, Rampini & Di Russo, 2006)
 Tachycines gansu (Gorochov, 2010)
 Tachycines gonggashanicus (Zhang & Liu, 2009)
 Tachycines kabaki (Gorochov, 2010)
 Tachycines lalinus Feng, Huang & Luo, 2019
 Tachycines latellai (Rampini & Di Russo, 2008)
 Tachycines latiliconcavus Zhu, Chen & Shi, 2020
 Tachycines latus (Zhang & Liu, 2009)
 Tachycines liboensis Zhu, Chen & Shi, 2020
 Tachycines lii Qin, Liu & Li, 2019
 Tachycines longicaudus Karny, 1934
 Tachycines longilaminus (Zhang & Liu, 2009)
 Tachycines lushuicus Qin, Liu & Li, 2019
 Tachycines maoershanensis Qin, Liu & Li, 2019
 Tachycines nocturnus (Gorochov, 1992)
 Tachycines nulliscleritus Zhu, Chen & Shi, 2020
 Tachycines omninocaecus (Gorochov, Rampini & Di Russo, 2006)
 Tachycines pallidus Qin, Liu & Li, 2019
 Tachycines papilious Zhu & Shi, 2021
 Tachycines paradoxus Zhu, Chen & Shi, 2020
 Tachycines parvus Qin, Liu & Li, 2019
 Tachycines pentagona Li, Feng & Luo, 2021
 Tachycines plumiopedella Li, Feng & Luo, 2021
 Tachycines proximus (Gorochov, Rampini & Di Russo, 2006)
 Tachycines quadratus Zhu & Shi, 2021
 Tachycines racovitzai Chopard, 1916
 Tachycines roundatus (Zhang & Liu, 2009)
 Tachycines semicrenatus (Gorochov, Rampini & Di Russo, 2006)
 Tachycines shiziensis Zhu & Shi, 2021
 Tachycines shuangcha Feng, Huang & Luo, 2020
 Tachycines sichuanus (Gorochov, 2010)
 Tachycines solida (Gorochov, Rampini & Di Russo, 2006)
 Tachycines sonlaensis (Gorochov, 1990)
 Tachycines sparsispinus Zhu & Shi, 2021
 Tachycines taenus Zhu, Chen & Shi, 2020
 Tachycines tongrenus Feng, Huang & Luo, 2020
 Tachycines tonkinensis Chopard, 1929
 Tachycines trapezialis Zhou & Yang, 2020
 Tachycines tuberus Zhu, Chen & Shi, 2020
 Tachycines umbellus Zhu, Chen & Shi, 2020
 Tachycines verus Qin, Liu & Li, 2019
 Tachycines vicinus Qin, Liu & Li, 2019
 Tachycines wuyishanicus (Zhang & Liu, 2009)
 Tachycines yueyangensis Qin, Liu & Li, 2019
 Tachycines zaoshu Feng, Huang & Luo, 2020
 Tachycines zorzini (Rampini & Di Russo, 2008)
subgenus Tachycines Adelung, 1902
 Tachycines asynamorus Adelung, 1902 – type species
 Tachycines baiyunjianensis Qin, Wang, Liu & Li, 2018
 Tachycines bilobatus Qin, Wang, Liu & Li, 2018
 Tachycines borealis (Cui & Liu, 2013)
 Tachycines chinensis Storozhenko, 1990
 Tachycines danpingensis Zhou, Ou, Shi, Long, Zhang & Zheng, 2021
 Tachycines denticulatus (Gorochov, 2010)
 Tachycines huaxi Huang & Luo, 2019
 Tachycines incisus Qin, Wang, Liu & Li, 2018
 Tachycines maximus Qin, Wang, Liu & Li, 2018
 Tachycines meditationis Würmli, 1973
 Tachycines multispinosus Qin, Wang, Liu & Li, 2018
 Tachycines rammei Karny, 1926
 Tachycines sichuanensis Qin, Wang, Liu & Li, 2018
 Tachycines svenhedini Karny, 1934
 Tachycines transversus Qin, Wang, Liu & Li, 2018
 Tachycines trilobatus Qin, Wang, Liu & Li, 2018
 Tachycines validus Chopard, 1921
 Tachycines xiai Qin, Wang, Liu & Li, 2018
 Tachycines yanlingensis Qin, Wang, Liu & Li, 2018
subgenus not determined
 Tachycines karnyi Qin, Wang, Liu & Li, 2018

References

External links

Ensifera genera
Rhaphidophoridae
Orthoptera of Asia
Orthoptera of Europe